Compressidentalium is a genus of tusk shells, marine scaphopod mollusks.

Species
Species within the genus Compressidentalium include:
 Compressidentalium ceciliae Scarabino, 1995
 Compressidentalium clathratum (Martens, 1881)
 Compressidentalium compressiusculum (Boissevain, 1906)
 Compressidentalium harasewychi Scarabino, 2008
 Compressidentalium hungerfordi (Pilsbry & Sharp, 1897)
 Compressidentalium lardum (Barnard, 1963)
 Compressidentalium legoffi Scarabino, 2008
 Compressidentalium pseudohungerfordi (Sahlmann, van der Beek & Wiese, 2016)
 Compressidentalium sedecimcostatum (Boissevain, 1906)
 Compressidentalium sibogae (Boissevain, 1906)
 Compressidentalium subcurvatum (E. A. Smith, 1906)
 Compressidentalium sumatrense (Plate, 1908)
 Compressidentalium zanzibarense (Plate, 1908)

References

 Habe, T. (1963). A classification of the scaphopod mollusks found in Japan and adjacent areas. Bulletin of the National Science Museum Tokyo. 6(3): 252-281, pls 37-38
 Scarabino V., 1995 Scaphopoda of the tropical Pacific and Indian Oceans, with description of 3 new genera and 42 new species P. Bouchet (ed) Résultats des Campagnes MUSORSTOM, Volume 14 Mémoires du Muséum National d'Histoire Naturelle, 167 189-379

External links
 Steiner, G.; Kabat, A. R. (2001). Catalogue of supraspecific taxa of Scaphopoda (Mollusca). Zoosystema. 23(3): 433-460

Dentaliidae
Mollusc genera